The SNCF BB 9003 and BB 9004 are French direct current electric locomotives with two bogies each having two driving axles. Built at the same time as SNCF BB 9001–9002, these four units were used to evaluate locomotives with total adhesion in the course of normal operation. They also served as prototypes that helped define the mechanical and electrical characteristics of future locomotives to be ordered in greater quantities.

Design 
Both BB 9003 and BB 9004 were electric locomotives using a Bo-Bo wheel configuration (meaning two bogies each with two powered axles). Both had twin pantographs and were powered by 1.5 kV DC overhead wires.

They differed slightly from one another, as BB 9003 used four Swiss-built Oerlikon 6F330 traction motors while BB 9004 used four French-built Jeumont-Schneider SW 4326 traction motors. BB 9003 was also lighter at 80 tonnes versus the 83 tonnes of BB 9004. BB 9003 was also more powerful than BB 9004 at  versus .

Their Jaquemin-designed bogies were later used in BB 9200-9300-9700, 12000–13000, 16000–16100, 20100, 25100-25150-25200 series locomotives, the body design (with common aesthetics) would be used in BB 9200-9300-9700, 9400, 16000–16100, 20100, 25100-25150-25200, 30000 series locomotives and Jeumont-Schneider traction equipment would be used in the BB 9200-9300-9700 series.

Operational history
BB 9003 was built and delivered in 1952 and was the first French locomotive to be remote-controlled from the exterior of its train. The event was widely broadcast in France and in other countries; an American television news crew sent an airplane to overfly the attempt and they were certain the train would derail before reaching 330 km/h. In fact, the airplane had trouble keeping up with the train. SNCF engineers were delighted at the performance; this attempt represented a beginning into the study of using electricity as the means of propulsion for high speed rail.

BB 9004 ran for only 21 years, being used in revenue service until 1973. After withdrawal from service, it was stored in Hausbergen, near Strasbourg. In 1979, the locomotive was sent to the workshops at Arles to be restored and it was donated to the Cité du Train in 1981. In 2003 it was displayed on the Champs Elysees in Paris as part of a major exhibition, L'exposition le Train Capitale. In 2005, BB 9004 was run one final time on the Landes line in a special train along with CC 7107 as part of the commemoration of the 50th anniversary of the world speed record.

Preservation 

BB 9004 is preserved at Cité du Train, in a livery similar to one worn during the 1955 record winning run. The locomotive, as preserved, uses the body from BB 9003 while using the frame, running gear and internal components from BB 9004. This was done as the body of 9004 was in too poor condition to be preserved.

Image Gallery

References

Standard gauge electric locomotives of France
SNCF locomotives
1500 V DC locomotives
Passenger locomotives